Hamida Banu  is an Indian athlete. She won a silver medal in  4 × 100 m relay  in the 1982 Asian Games.

References

Athletes (track and field) at the 1982 Asian Games
Asian Games competitors for India
Asian Games silver medalists for India
Asian Games medalists in athletics (track and field)
Indian female sprinters
Living people
Year of birth missing (living people)